John Carter Cash (born March 3, 1970) is an American country singer-songwriter and musician.  He is the only child of Johnny Cash and June Carter Cash, and the grandson of Maybelle Carter.

Biography

For several years after his birth, his father altered the conclusion of "A Boy Named Sue" to mention him by name; in 1972 his parents recorded the duet "I Got a Boy (And His Name is John)" about their son; and in 1975 a photograph of him with his father was on the sleeve of the album Look at Them Beans.

He worked as a music producer on his mother's albums Press On and Wildwood Flower, which won a Grammy Award for Best Traditional Folk album.

He was the associate Producer of his father's American III: Solitary Man and American IV: The Man Comes Around. In the early 1990s he toured with his father as a rhythm guitarist.  He has produced recordings for many artists like: Sheryl Crow, Loretta Lynn, Willie Nelson, Elvis Costello, Kris Kristofferson, Emmylou Harris, and Vince Gill. He owns and operates Cash Cabin Enterprises, LLC., a music production company in the Cash Cabin Studio.

He married Ana Cristina Cash, a singer, in 2016 in Charleston, South Carolina. They have two children, Grace June and James Kristoffer. Cash has three older children, Joseph John, Anna Maybelle and Jack Ezra from two previous marriages.

Discography

As solo artist

With Carter Family III

Filmography

Books 
Cash has written books about his parents:
 Anchored in Love: an intimate portrait of June Carter Cash, Thomas Nelson, 2007
 House of Cash: the legacies of my father Johnny Cash, Insight Editions, 2011
 Cash and Carter family cookbook: recipes and recollections from Johnny and June's table, Thomas Nelson, 2018
and for children:
 Momma Loves Her Little Son, Little Simon Inspirations, 2009
 Daddy Loves His Little Girl, Little Simon Inspirations, 2010
 The Cat in the Rhinestone Suit, Little Simon Inspirations, 2012
 Lupus Rex, a novel, Ravenstone, 2013.

See also
House of Cash

References

American male singer-songwriters
American country singer-songwriters
American film producers
Record producers from Tennessee
American people of English descent
American people of Scottish descent
Living people
Johnny Cash
Cash–Carter family
21st-century American singers
The Tennessee Three members
The Great Eighties Eight members
1970 births